Great Victoria Street is a railway station serving the city centre of Belfast, Northern Ireland. It is situated near Great Victoria Street, one of Belfast's premier commercial zones, and Sandy Row. It is also in a more central position than Lanyon Place (ironically named Belfast Central until September 2018), with the Europa Hotel, Grand Opera House and The Crown Liquor Saloon all nearby.

Great Victoria Street station shares a site with Europa Buscentre, the primary bus station serving Belfast City Centre. It will be replaced by Belfast Grand Central station, a combined bus and railway station, by 2025.

History

The station is on the site of a former linen mill, beside where Durham Street crossed the Blackstaff River at the Saltwater (now Boyne) Bridge.

A new terminal building, probably designed by Ulster Railway engineer John Godwin, was completed in 1848. Godwin later founded the School of Civil Engineering at Queen's College.

The station, built directly on Victoria Street, was Belfast's first railway terminus, and as such was called just "Belfast" until 1852. By this time, two other railway companies had opened termini in Belfast, so the Ulster Railway renamed its terminus "Belfast Victoria Street" for clarity. In 1855 the Dublin and Belfast Junction Railway was completed, making Victoria Street the terminus for one of the most important main lines in Ireland. The Ulster Railway changed the station name again to "Great Victoria Street" in 1856, in line with a change of the street name.

In 1876 the Ulster Railway became part of the Great Northern Railway (GNR), making Great Victoria Street the terminus for a network that extended south to Dublin and west to Derry and Bundoran.

Express passenger traffic to and from Dublin Connolly station was always Great Victoria Street's most prestigious traffic. The GNR upgraded its expresses over the decades and in 1947 introduced the Enterprise non-stop service between the two capitals. As Belfast suburbs grew, commuter traffic also grew in volume.

In 1958, the Ulster Transport Authority took over Northern Ireland's bus and rail services. Three years later Great Victoria Street station was modernised, and a bus centre incorporated into the facility. Then in 1968, a large section of the 1848 terminal building was demolished to make way for the development of the Europa Hotel, which opened in 1971. In April 1976 Northern Ireland Railways closed both Great Victoria Street and the  terminus of the Bangor line and replaced them both with a new Belfast Central Station, now renamed . The remainder of Great Victoria Street station was demolished.

After a feasibility study was commissioned in 1986 it was agreed that a new development on the site, incorporating the reintroduction of the Great Northern Railway, was viable. The Great Northern Tower had already been built on the site of the old station terminus in 1992, and so the second Great Victoria Street Station was built behind the tower block, yards from the site of its predecessor. The new station was opened on 30 September 1995.

Railway station

The current station has two island platforms providing a total of four platform faces. Platforms 2 and 3 run the full length of the site and open onto the station's main concourse. Platforms 1 and 4 are half the length and are accessible by walking down the other platforms.

Great Victoria Street is the hub of Northern Ireland's suburban rail services, with Bangor line, Derry~Londonderry line, Newry line and Larne Line trains all terminating there.

Service

There is also a half-hourly service on the Larne Line, with the terminus being  every half hour and  being the terminus every hour.

On Sundays, the Bangor, Larne, and Portadown Line services all reduce to hourly operation. Derry~Londonderry Line services reduce to two-hourly operation, with only seven trains running each way. Derry~Londonderry Line trains are still hourly but alternate between Derry Waterside and Portrush, except for the final train of the evening, which terminates at Coleraine.

Air Link
Railway access from Great Victoria Street at Sydenham links into George Best Belfast City Airport on the line to Bangor.

Future
NI Railways has built a new traincare facility next to Adelaide station for its new Class 4000 diesel multiple units. The opportunity was also taken to improve the infrastructure at Great Victoria Street; the plan to begin with was to reduce the curves by realigning the track, and moving the buffer stops and the route from the platforms to the concourse to the other side of Durham Street. However, under Translink's subsequent plan to build a new integrated transport hub, the proposal has expanded to the potential construction of a brand new 6–8 platform station on the site of the old Grosvenor Road freight depot, close to the existing station, because the existing site is too constrained for any further expansion.

Rail and sea connections

Port of Belfast
The Port of Belfast has a Stena Line ferry connecting to Cairnryan for the bus link to Stranraer and onward trains along the Glasgow South Western Line to Glasgow Central.

Port of Larne
The Larne line connects with Larne Harbour with P&O Ferries sailing to Cairnryan for the bus link to Stranraer and onward trains along the Glasgow South Western Line to Glasgow Central, as well as alternative sailings by P&O Ferries to Troon also on the Glasgow South Western Line to Glasgow Central.

Europa Buscentre
Great Victoria Street is part of a major public transport interchange, being adjacent to the Europa Buscentre. This was built in 1991 as the ground floor level of a multi-storey car park. The Buscentre is the Belfast terminus for most Ulsterbus "Goldline" services in Northern Ireland. These serve various destinations that are not on the railway network, including Enniskillen, Banbridge, Omagh, Downpatrick, Cavan, Newcastle, Strabane and Armagh. Also, services from the Buscentre serve both Belfast City Airport and Belfast International Airport directly. Ulsterbus runs joint services with Bus Éireann for its direct express service to Dublin and Dublin Airport, with National Express to Dumfries, Carlisle, Manchester, Birmingham, Milton Keynes and London, and with Citylink to Glasgow and Edinburgh.

Gallery

References

External links

Great Victoria Street Railway Station
Railway stations in Northern Ireland opened in 1839
Railway stations in Northern Ireland closed in 1976
Railway stations in Northern Ireland opened in 1995
Railway stations opened by NI Railways
Reopened railway stations in Northern Ireland
Railway stations served by NI Railways
1839 establishments in Ireland